The Blizzard of 1999 was a strong winter snowstorm which struck the Midwestern United States and portions of central and eastern Canada, hitting hardest in Iowa, Wisconsin, Illinois, Indiana, Michigan, Ohio, southern Ontario, and southern Quebec dumping as much as  of snow in many areas. Chicago received a recorded . The storm hit just after New Year's Day, between January 2 and January 4, 1999.  Travel was severely disrupted throughout the areas and the cities of Chicago and Toronto were also paralyzed. Additionally, record low temperatures were measured in many towns in the days immediately after the storm (January 4 – January 8).

The storm
The storm produced  of snow in Chicago and was rated by the National Weather Service as the second worst blizzard to hit Chicago in the 20th century, after the Blizzard of 1967.

The areas with the heaviest snows,  or more, included central and northern Illinois, southern Wisconsin, central and northern Indiana, southern Michigan, northern Ohio, and southeast Canada.

South of the snow line, the storm produced a significant ice storm across western New York, near the Rochester region and the Genesee Valley where numerous power failures were reported.

Snowfall totals
Chicago broke a one-day snowfall record with  falling on January 2. The total snowfall figures are below:

South Haven, MI: 
Chicago/O'Hare, IL: 
Chicago/Midway, IL: 
Slinger, WI: 
Galesburg, IL: 
Barrington, IL: 
Lake Villa, IL: 
Chatsworth, IL: 
Dixon, IL: 
Mount Clemens, MI: 
Toronto, ON: 
Portage, IN: 
Glenwood, IL: 
Olympia Fields, IL: 
Brookfield, IL: 
LaGrange Park, IL: 
Remington, IN: 
Aurora, IL: 
Crestwood, IL: 
Bloomington/Normal, IL: 
Algonquin, IL: 
Bourbonnais, IL: 
Streamwood, IL: 
Lafayette, IN: 
Orland Park, IL: 
Rochester, MI: 
Channahon, IL: 
Coal City, IL: 
Fairbury, IL: 
Geneva, IL: 
DeKalb, IL: 
Valparaiso, IN: 
Willow Springs, IL: 
Detroit, MI: 
Earlville, IL: 
Monticello, IN: 
Naperville, IL: 
Ottawa, ON: 
Mundelein, IL: 
Compton, IL: 
Rochelle, IL: 
Harvard, IL: 
Rockford, IL: 
Flint, MI:

Impact
Midwest airports were closed, some for several days.  Thousands of flights were canceled. Detroit Metro (DTW) was one of the most severely impacted airports. Thousands of passengers traveling on Northwest Airlines (NWA) were stranded for hours. In 2001, NWA agreed to pay more than $7 million in compensation to stranded passengers. Some passengers spent more than eight and a half hours in their planes after arriving at DTW.

In southern Ontario, Toronto Pearson International Airport was shut down, while numerous flights from Ottawa International Airport were canceled. As a result, the mayor and city, through the media endured ridicule from other parts of Canada more prone to such high snowfall amounts. The series of storms that hit Toronto were severe enough to be the winter Storm of the Century despite the fact they were more than one storm.

Rail service was halted or delayed, and highways were impassable.  Lake Shore Drive in Chicago was closed for the first time ever.  300 of the Chicago Transit Authority’s 2600-series cars went out of service. Stranded travellers were accommodated in emergency shelters.  The bitterly cold temperatures created large ice floes on the inland waterways, causing shipping delays.

Schools were closed for several days, and many businesses were closed as well. Of those that were able to remain open, stores selling snow removal equipment were doing a booming business.  

There was also a nationwide blood shortage since a high proportion of blood donations come from the Midwest and many could not make it to the hospital and donate during the storm or during the subsequent cold snap.

In much of Northwest Indiana, blackouts occurred for days at a time. Porter County was without electricity for about 3 days total. Local buildings, such as schools, offered generator-powered heat in their auditoriums.

The costs
Human cost: 78 people perished in the storm.  The breakdown of deaths is as follows:
39 auto-related deaths
5 snowmobile-related deaths
32 deaths from over-exertion and heart attacks primarily due to shoveling snow
2 froze to death

Financial cost: Losses as a result of the storm are estimated between $300 and $400 million.

Federal aid: 45 counties in Illinois and some areas of Indiana were declared federal disaster areas by President Bill Clinton and eligible to receive federal aid.

See also
List of Regional Snowfall Index Category 4 winter storms

References

External links
 National Climatic Data Center Storm Summary

Blizzards in Canada
Blizzards in the United States
1999 meteorology
1999 natural disasters
1999 natural disasters in the United States
1999 disasters in Canada
Natural disasters in Illinois
Natural disasters in Indiana
Natural disasters in Iowa
Natural disasters in Michigan
Natural disasters in Ohio
Natural disasters in Ontario
Natural disasters in Quebec
Natural disasters in Wisconsin
January 1999 events in North America
1999 in Ontario
1999 in Quebec